João Paulo Pereira Bravo (born January 7, 1979 in Presidente Prudente) is a Brazilian volleyball player. He is 192 cm and plays as Wing spiker.

Bravo began his volleyball career in Brazil, where he won an award in 2000 as the most promising young player in the country. In 2002, Bravo transferred to the Belgian team Noliko Maaseik, where he not only was chosen the most valuable player in the country, but also experienced league and cup championships. He transferred to the Italian team Piacenza in 2005, and played in the Italian 1st league for five seasons, including one year for Vibo Valentia. With Piacenza, Bravo experienced championships in the Italian league, Italian Cup and the Europe Top Teams Cup. In 2008, he was chosen the best server in the European Champions League. He was part of the Brazil men's national volleyball team at the 2010 FIVB Volleyball Men's World Championship in Italy. He played for Arkas Spor Kulubu.

References

External links
 Player profile at arkasspor.com

1979 births
Brazilian men's volleyball players
Living people
Sportspeople from Goiás
Arkas Spor volleyball players
Outside hitters